José Carlos dos Reis (born February 11, 1988 in Varginha) is a Brazilian football forward for Icasa.

He played in 2007 and in 2008 for Brasilis, moving in February 2008 to Neftchi Baku in the Azerbaijan Premier League.

References

External links 
Profile at the Brazilian FA database 
Profile on Official Neftchi website 

Living people
1988 births
Brazilian footballers
Brazilian expatriate footballers
Guarani FC players
Brazilian expatriate sportspeople in Azerbaijan
Expatriate footballers in Azerbaijan
Association football midfielders
Azerbaijan Premier League players
Neftçi PFK players
Mogi Mirim Esporte Clube players